Uroš Palibrk (born 22 March 1992) is a Slovenian football forward who plays for Omonia Aradippou in the Cypriot Second Division.

References

External links
PrvaLiga profile 

Uroš Palibrk at ZeroZero

1992 births
Living people
Sportspeople from Kranj
Slovenian footballers
Slovenia youth international footballers
Association football forwards
NK Triglav Kranj players
Slovenian expatriate footballers
A.C. Milan players
HNK Rijeka players
Lierse S.K. players
NK Ivančna Gorica players
Omonia Aradippou players
Croatian Football League players
Slovenian PrvaLiga players
Cypriot Second Division players
Expatriate footballers in Italy
Expatriate footballers in Croatia
Expatriate footballers in Belgium
Expatriate footballers in Austria
Expatriate footballers in Cyprus
Slovenian expatriate sportspeople in Italy
Slovenian expatriate sportspeople in Croatia
Slovenian expatriate sportspeople in Belgium
Slovenian expatriate sportspeople in Austria
Slovenian expatriate sportspeople in Cyprus